Doin' the Nasty is the debut album by the Canadian hard rock band Slik Toxik. The album was released in 1992. The album reached #61 in Canada and was certified gold by the CRIA.

"Helluvatime", "By the Fireside", "White Lies, Black Truth", and "Sweet Asylum" were released as singles and they all had accompanying music videos.

The album won the 1993 Juno Award for "Best Rock Album of the Year". At the 1992 MuchMusic Video Awards, the "Helluvatime" video won the People's Choice Award for "Best Video of the Year" and "Best Metal Video Award".

Track listing
"Big Fuckin' Deal"
"Helluvatime"
"Sweet Asylum"
"White Lies, Black Truth"
"Cherry Bomb"
"Marionette"
"It's Not Easy"
"Crashed"
"By the Fireside"
"Blood Money"
"Cheap Nicotine"
"Midnight Grind"
"Rachel's Dead"

Band members
Nick Walsh – vocals
Rob Bruce – guitar
Kevin Gale – guitar
Pat Howarth – bass
Neal Busby – drums

Charts

Album

Singles

Awards

Certifications

1993 Juno Awards

|-
| rowspan="2" align="center"|1993
| align="center"| Slik Toxik
| align="center"| Most Promising Group
|
|-
| align="center"|Doin' the Nasty
| align="center"|Best Rock Album of the Year
|

MuchMusic Video Awards

|-
| rowspan="2" align="center"|1992
| rowspan="2" align="center"|"Helluvatime"
| align="center"|Best Metal Video Award
|
|-
| align="center"|People's Choice Award: Best Video of the Year
|

References

1992 debut albums
Juno Award for Rock Album of the Year albums
Slik Toxik albums